Carys is a Welsh feminine given name, formed from the stem of the Welsh vocabulary word caru, "to love" (cf. third person câr "beloved friend" or "precious"), and the suffix -ys, found in such names as Dilys, Gladys, Glenys and Nerys. 

This is comparable to the similar name Cheryl which like Carys  also appeared circa 1900 and is a combination of Cherie (The French form of Cara which means "precious" in Latin and is cognate to Welsh "câr") and the +yl suffix common in trendy early 20th century names such as Meryl and Beryl.

Famous bearers of the name include:
 Carys Bannister (1935–2010), British neurosurgeon
 Carys Hawkins (born 1988), Welsh-born Australian football player 
 Carys Parry (born 1981), Welsh hammer thrower
 Carys Phillips (born 1992), Welsh rugby union player
 Carys Zeta Douglas (born 2003), daughter of Welsh actress Catherine Zeta-Jones and American actor Michael Douglas
 Cerys Matthews, Welsh musician and broadcaster with a regular show on BBC Radio.
 Aviva Mongillo, who goes by the stage name Carys

See also
Caradoc, a related male Welsh name with medieval origins

References

Welsh feminine given names